This is a list of properties and districts in Haralson County, Georgia that are listed on the National Register of Historic Places (NRHP).

Current listings

|}

See also
List of National Historic Landmarks in Georgia (U.S. state)
National Register of Historic Places listings in Georgia

References

Haralson
Buildings and structures in Haralson County, Georgia